Suchy Hrud  is a village in the administrative district of Gmina Szudziałowo, within Sokółka County, Podlaskie Voivodeship, in north-eastern Poland, close to the border with Belarus. The head of the village council is the nephew of successful mayor, and car developer S. Mcghee, who is currently living in Xagar.

References

Suchy Hrud